Coleophora spiralis is a moth of the family Coleophoridae. It is found in Mongolia.

Subspecies
Coleophora spiralis spiralis Falkovitsh, 1977
Coleophora spiralis provecta (Falkovitsh, 1993)

References

spiralis
Moths of Asia
Moths described in 1977